The 28th Legislative Assembly of British Columbia sat from 1967 to 1969. The members were elected in the British Columbia general election held in September 1966. The Social Credit Party led by W. A. C. Bennett formed the government. The New Democratic Party (NDP) led by Robert Strachan formed the official opposition.

William Harvey Murray served as speaker for the assembly.

Members of the 28th General Assembly 
The following members were elected to the assembly in 1966:

Notes:

Party standings

By-elections 
By-elections were held to replace members for various reasons:

Notes:

Other changes 
Cariboo (res. Robert Bonner 1969)

References 

Political history of British Columbia
Terms of British Columbia Parliaments
1967 establishments in British Columbia
1969 disestablishments in British Columbia
20th century in British Columbia